The Al Hamra Firduos Tower is a skyscraper in Kuwait City, Kuwait. It is the tallest building in Kuwait. Construction of the skyscraper started in 2005. It was completed in 2011.

Profile

The building utilizes wrapped glass on the east, north, and west both for aesthetics and to reduce the amount of reflective surface area on the south facade, which also features brushed Jura limestone. Flared walls reaching from the southwest and southeast corners of the core span the entire height of the tower, and there is a column-free 24-meter-tall lobby

The landscape was designed by Francis Landscapes.

The tower was included in the list of the best inventions of 2011 by Time magazine.

Awards
2011: Emporis Skyscraper Award
2010: Cityscape • Commercial / Mixed Use Built 
2008: Chicago Athenaeum - American Architecture Award
2008: Chicago Athenaeum - International Architecture Award for best new global design
2008: MIPIM/Architectural Review - MIPIM Future Project Award: Overall
2008: MIPIM/Architectural Review - MIPIM Future Project Award: Tall Buildings
2007: Miami Architectural Bienal - Bronze Unbuilt Project

See also
 List of tallest buildings in Kuwait
 Abu Dhabi Investment Authority Tower in Abu Dhabi, another skyscraper with a fold-like exterior

References

External links 
 
 
 
 
 

2011 establishments in Kuwait
Skyscrapers in Kuwait
Buildings and structures in Kuwait City
Office buildings completed in 2011
Skidmore, Owings & Merrill buildings
Skyscraper office buildings